Bethel African Methodist Episcopal Church of Monongahela City is a historic church at the junction of 7th and Main Streets in Monongahela City, Pennsylvania.

It was built in 1871 and added to the National Register in 2002.

It is a brick Gothic Revival style building, one of about five Gothic Revival buildings in the city.

It is designated as a historic public landmark by the Washington County History & Landmarks Foundation.

References

Episcopal churches in Pennsylvania
Churches on the National Register of Historic Places in Pennsylvania
Gothic Revival church buildings in Pennsylvania
Churches completed in 1871
19th-century Episcopal church buildings
African-American history of Pennsylvania
Churches in Washington County, Pennsylvania
Monongahela, Pennsylvania
National Register of Historic Places in Washington County, Pennsylvania